Heather J. Forster Smith served as Chief Justice of the Ontario Superior Court of Justice from 2002 - 2019. She was the first woman to be appointed to that position.

Smith graduated from Queen's University and was called to the Ontario Bar in 1973.  She began her legal career as a Crown prosecutor with the federal Department of Justice.

Her judicial career began in 1983:

 County and District Court judge 1983
 Justice of the Ontario Court of Justice (General Division) 1990
 Associate Chief Justice of the Ontario Court (General Division) 1996
 Retired from the Ontario Superior Court of Justice on June 30, 2019

Personal life

Smith was married to former Senator David Smith until his death on February 26, 2020.

References 

Canadian women judges
Judges in Ontario
Living people
Queen's University at Kingston alumni
Year of birth missing (living people)